Lidia Morant Varó (born 22 November 1990 in Gandia), known as Lidia Morant or Lydia Morant, is a Spanish swimmer who competed in the 2008 Summer Olympics, in the 200 m backstroke, and the 2012 Summer Olympics, in the 4 x 200 m freestyle.

Notes

References

External links
 
 
 
 

1990 births
Living people
Spanish female freestyle swimmers
Spanish female backstroke swimmers
Olympic swimmers of Spain
Swimmers at the 2008 Summer Olympics
Swimmers at the 2012 Summer Olympics
People from Gandia
Sportspeople from the Province of Valencia
21st-century Spanish women